Harpalus pulchirinulus is a species of ground beetle in the subfamily Harpalinae. It was described by Reitter in 1900.

References

pulchirinulus
Beetles described in 1900